Beek is a town and municipality in Limburg, Netherlands.

Beek (Dutch for "stream") may also refer to:

Places
 Beek, Berg en Dal, a town in Gelderland, Netherlands
 Beek, Montferland, a town in Gelderland, Netherlands
 De Beek, Apeldoorn, a hamlet in Apeldorn, Gelderland, Netherlands
 De Beek, Ermelo, a population center in Ermelo, Gelderland, Netherlands
 Beek, Venray, a hamlet in Limburg, Netherlands
 Beek en Donk, a town in Laarbeek, North Brabant, Netherlands
 Prinsenbeek or Beek, a town and former municipality in North Brabant, Netherlands
 De Beek, Asten,  a town in Asten, North Brabant, Netherlands

Waterways 
Beek (Hamme), a river of Lower Saxony, Germany
 Beek, a strait separating the German island of Koos from the mainland

People with the surname 
 Anna van Westerstee Beek (1657–1717), Dutch publisher of maps
 David Beck (1621–1656), Dutch portrait painter
 Joop Beek (1917–1983), Dutch-Indonesian priest and political consultant
 Joseph Beek (1880–1968), American Secretary of the California State Senate

See also
 Beck (disambiguation)
 Becque (disambiguation), Northern France adaptation of the word
 Beke (disambiguation)
 Beeks